Jerzy Zbigniew Stanuch (born 17 May 1953, in Nowy Sącz) is a former Polish slalom canoeist who competed at the international level from 1971 to 1978.

He won three medals in the K1 team event at the ICF Canoe Slalom World Championships with two silvers (1973, 1975) and a bronze (1977). He finished 14th in the K1 event at the 1972 Summer Olympics in Munich.

Stanuch's daughter Agnieszka also competed in canoe slalom for Poland.

References

1953 births
Canoeists at the 1972 Summer Olympics
Living people
Olympic canoeists of Poland
Polish male canoeists
Sportspeople from Nowy Sącz
Medalists at the ICF Canoe Slalom World Championships